This is a list of regiments from Missouri that fought in the Union Army during the American Civil War (1861–1865). The list of Missouri Confederate Civil War units is shown separately.

Long-Enlistment Infantry Regiments

1st Missouri Volunteer Infantry - Reorganized as batteries of 1st Missouri Lt Arty
2nd Missouri Volunteer Infantry
3rd Missouri Volunteer Infantry
3rd Missouri US Reserve Corps Infantry - "Turner Zouaves"
4th Missouri Volunteer Infantry 
5th Missouri Volunteer Infantry
6th Missouri Volunteer Infantry - "Bates Guards"
7th Missouri Volunteer Infantry - "The Irish Regiment", "The Irish Seventh"
8th Missouri Volunteer Infantry - "American Zouaves"
9th Missouri Volunteer Infantry - "Washington Zouaves"
10th Missouri Volunteer Infantry
11th Missouri Volunteer Infantry
12th Missouri Volunteer Infantry
13th Missouri Volunteer Infantry
Western Sharpshooters-14th Missouri Volunteer Infantry - (formerly) Birge's Western Sharpshooters (later 66th Illinois Volunteer Infantry Regiment (Western Sharpshooters))
15th Missouri Volunteer Infantry
16th Missouri Volunteer Infantry - Failed to complete organization
17th Missouri Volunteer Infantry - "Western Turner Rifles"
18th Missouri Volunteer Infantry
19th Missouri Volunteer Infantry - Failed to complete organization
20th Missouri Volunteer Infantry - Failed to complete organization
21st Missouri Volunteer Infantry
22nd Missouri Volunteer Infantry
23rd Missouri Volunteer Infantry
24th Missouri Volunteer Infantry - The Lyon Legion
25th Missouri Volunteer Infantry
26th Missouri Volunteer Infantry
27th Missouri Volunteer Infantry
27th Missouri Volunteer Mounted Infantry
28th Missouri Volunteer Infantry - Failed to complete organization
29th Missouri Volunteer Infantry
30th Missouri Volunteer Infantry - "Shamrock Regiment" (second Missouri Irish Regiment)
31st Missouri Volunteer Infantry
32nd Missouri Volunteer Infantry
33rd Missouri Volunteer Infantry
34th Missouri Volunteer Infantry - Failed to complete organization
35th Missouri Volunteer Infantry
36th Missouri Volunteer Infantry
37th Missouri Volunteer Infantry - Failed to complete organization
38th Missouri Volunteer Infantry - Failed to complete organization
39th Missouri Volunteer Infantry
40th Missouri Volunteer Infantry
41st Missouri Volunteer Infantry
42nd Missouri Volunteer Infantry
43rd Missouri Volunteer Infantry
44th Missouri Volunteer Infantry
45th Missouri Volunteer Infantry
46th Missouri Volunteer Infantry
47th Missouri Volunteer Infantry
48th Missouri Volunteer Infantry
49th Missouri Volunteer Infantry
50th Missouri Volunteer Infantry
51st Missouri Volunteer Infantry
52nd Missouri Volunteer Infantry
53rd Missouri Volunteer Infantry
54th Missouri Volunteer Infantry
56th Missouri Volunteer Infantry

Short-Enlistment Infantry Regiments
1st Missouri Volunteer Infantry (3 Months, 1861)
2nd Missouri Volunteer Infantry (3 months, 1861)
3rd Missouri Volunteer Infantry (3 months, 1861) "Lyon's Fahnenwacht" (Lyon's Color Guard)
4th Missouri Volunteer Infantry (3 months, 1861) "Schwarze Jäger" (Black Hunters, aka Black Rifle Hunters)
5th Missouri Volunteer Infantry (3 months, 1861)

1st Northeast Regiment of Missouri Infantry, 1861
2nd Northeast Regiment of Missouri Infantry, 1861

1st Missouri, US Reserve Corps Infantry (3 months, 1861)
2nd Missouri, US Reserve Corps Infantry (3 months, 1861)
3rd Missouri, US Reserve Corps Infantry (3 months, 1861) "Turner-Zuaven" (Turner Zouaves)
4th Missouri, US Reserve Corps Infantry (3 months, 1861) 
5th Missouri, US Reserve Corps Infantry (3 months, 1861)

Early War Home Guard Organizations

Fourteenth Missouri Volunteers (Lafayette County Home Guard)
Adair County Home Guard Company Infantry (Mounted)
Adair County Home Guard Company Infantry
Allen's Citizens Corps Home Guard (Calhoun, Henry Co)
Benton County Home Guard Regiment Infantry
Boonville Battalion Home Guard Infantry
Brookfield Company Home Guard Infantry (Linn Co)
Caldwell County Company Home Guard Infantry
Cape Girardeau Battalion Home Guard Infantry
Carondelet County Company Home Guard Infantry
Cass County Regiment Home Guard Infantry
Clinton County Company Home Guard Infantry (Org by BG Lyon)
Clinton County Company Home Guard Infantry (Org by Col Tuttle)
Cole County Regiment Home Guard Infantry
Dallas County Regiment Home Guard Infantry
De Kalb County Regiment Home Guard Infantry
De Doto County Company Home Guard Infantry
Douglas County Company Home Guard Infantry
Franklin County Regiment Home Guard Infantry
Fremont Rangers Home Guard Infantry (5 Companies)
Gasconade County Battalion Home Guard Infantry (2nd)
Greene County Company Home Guard Infantry
Gentry County Regiment Home Guard Infantry
Greene And Christian Counties Company Home Guard Infantry
Harrison County Regiment Home Guard Infantry
Jefferson City Battalion Home Guard Infantry
Johnson County Regiment Home Guard Infantry
King's Company Railroad Guard
Knox County Regiment Home Guard Infantry
Lawrence County Regiment Home Guard Infantry
Lewis County Company Home Guard Infantry
Lexington County Company Home Guard Infantry
Livingston County Company Home Guard Infantry
Marion County Battalion Home Guard Infantry
Moniteau County Company Home Guard Infantry
Nodaway County Regiment Home Guard Infantry
Osage County Battalion Home Guard Infantry
Osage County Regiment And Hickory County Battalion Home Guard Infantry
Ozark County Regiment Home Guard Infantry
Pacific Battalion (ink's) Home Guard Infantry
Pettis County Regiment Home Guard Infantry
Phelps County Company Home Guard Infantry (maries Co. Indpt. Company)
Phelps County Company Home Guard Infantry (bennight's)
Phelps' Regiment Of Home Guard Infantry (green County)
Pike County Regiment Home Guard Infantry
Pilot Knob Company Home Guard Infantry
Polk County Regiment Home Guard Infantry
Potosi County Regiment Home Guard Infantry
Putnam County Home Guard Infantry - (2 Companies)
St. Charles County Battalion Home Guard Infantry (krekel's)
Scott County Battalion Home Guard Infantry
Sibley Point Home Guard Company (adair County)
Stonas Independent Company Ozark County Home Guard Infantry
Stone Prairie (barry County) Company Home Guard Infantry
Stone County Regiment Home Guard Infantry
Shawneetown (putnam County) Home Guard Company Infantry
Sullivan County Home Guard Infantry (2 Companies)
Shelby County Company Home Guard Infantry
Webster County Regiment Home Guard Infantry

Enrolled Missouri Militia

1st Enrolled Missouri Militia
2nd Enrolled Missouri Militia
3rd Enrolled Missouri Militia
4th Enrolled Missouri Militia
5th Enrolled Missouri Militia
6th Enrolled Missouri Militia
7th Enrolled Missouri Militia
8th Enrolled Missouri Militia
9th Enrolled Missouri Militia
10th Enrolled Missouri Militia
11th Enrolled Missouri Militia
13th Enrolled Missouri Militia
16th Enrolled Missouri Militia
17th Enrolled Missouri Militia
22nd Enrolled Missouri Militia
23rd Enrolled Missouri Militia
24th Enrolled Missouri Militia
25th Enrolled Missouri Militia
26th Enrolled Missouri Militia
27th Enrolled Missouri Militia
28th Enrolled Missouri Militia
29th Enrolled Missouri Militia
30th Enrolled Missouri Militia
31st Enrolled Missouri Militia
32nd Enrolled Missouri Militia
33rd Enrolled Missouri Militia
34th Enrolled Missouri Militia
35th Enrolled Missouri Militia
36th Enrolled Missouri Militia
37th Enrolled Missouri Militia
38th Enrolled Missouri Militia
39th Enrolled Missouri Militia
40th Enrolled Missouri Militia
41st Enrolled Missouri Militia
42nd Enrolled Missouri Militia
43rd Enrolled Missouri Militia
44th Enrolled Missouri Militia
45th Enrolled Missouri Militia
46th Enrolled Missouri Militia
47th Enrolled Missouri Militia
48th Enrolled Missouri Militia
49th Enrolled Missouri Militia
50th Enrolled Missouri Militia
51st Enrolled Missouri Militia
52nd Enrolled Missouri Militia
53rd Enrolled Missouri Militia
54th Enrolled Missouri Militia
55th Enrolled Missouri Militia
56th Enrolled Missouri Militia
57th Enrolled Missouri Militia
58th Enrolled Missouri Militia
59th Enrolled Missouri Militia
60th Enrolled Missouri Militia
61st Enrolled Missouri Militia
62nd Enrolled Missouri Militia
63rd Enrolled Missouri Militia
64th Enrolled Missouri Militia
65th Enrolled Missouri Militia
66th Enrolled Missouri Militia
67th Enrolled Missouri Militia
68th Enrolled Missouri Militia
69th Enrolled Missouri Militia
70th Enrolled Missouri Militia
71st Enrolled Missouri Militia
72nd Enrolled Missouri Militia
73rd Enrolled Missouri Militia
74th Enrolled Missouri Militia
75th Enrolled Missouri Militia
76th Enrolled Missouri Militia
77th Enrolled Missouri Militia
78th Enrolled Missouri Militia
79th Enrolled Missouri Militia
80th Enrolled Missouri Militia
81st Enrolled Missouri Militia
82nd Enrolled Missouri Militia
83rd Enrolled Missouri Militia
84th Enrolled Missouri Militia
85th Enrolled Missouri Militia
86th Enrolled Missouri Militia
87th Enrolled Missouri Militia
88th Enrolled Missouri Militia
89th Enrolled Missouri Militia

Provisional Enrolled Missouri Militia
1st Provisional Enrolled Missouri Militia
2nd Provisional Enrolled Missouri Militia
3rd Provisional Enrolled Missouri Militia
4th Provisional Enrolled Missouri Militia
5th Provisional Enrolled Missouri Militia
6th Provisional Enrolled Missouri Militia
7th Provisional Enrolled Missouri Militia
8th Provisional Enrolled Missouri Militia
9th Provisional Enrolled Missouri Militia

Missouri State Militia
1st Battalion Missouri State Militia Infantry "Albins'"

Missouri State Militia Cavalry

1st Missouri State Militia Cavalry
1st Battalion Missouri State Militia Cavalry "Krekel's"
2nd Missouri State Militia Cavalry
2nd Battalion Missouri State Militia Cavalry
3rd Missouri State Militia Cavalry (Old)
3rd Missouri State Militia Cavalry (New)
5th Missouri State Militia Cavalry
5th Missouri State Militia Cavalry (Old)
5th Missouri State Militia Cavalry (New)
6th Missouri State Militia Cavalry
7th Missouri State Militia Cavalry
8th Missouri State Militia Cavalry
9th Missouri State Militia Cavalry
10th Missouri State Militia Cavalry
11th Missouri State Militia Cavalry
12th Missouri State Militia Cavalry
13th Missouri State Militia Cavalry
14th Missouri State Militia Cavalry

Cavalry

1st Missouri Volunteer Cavalry
2nd Missouri Volunteer Cavalry - Merrill's Horse
3rd Missouri Volunteer Cavalry
4th Missouri Volunteer Cavalry
5th Missouri Volunteer Cavalry
6th Missouri Volunteer Cavalry
7th Missouri Volunteer Cavalry
8th Missouri Volunteer Cavalry
9th Missouri Volunteer Cavalry
10th Missouri Volunteer Cavalry
11th Missouri Volunteer Cavalry
12th Missouri Volunteer Cavalry
13th Missouri Volunteer Cavalry
14th Missouri Volunteer Cavalry
15th Missouri Volunteer Cavalry
16th Missouri Volunteer Cavalry
17th Missouri Volunteer Cavalry
18th Missouri Volunteer Cavalry

Artillery

1st Missouri Light Artillery Regiment
Battery A
Battery B
Battery C
Battery D
Battery E
Battery F
Battery G
Battery H
Battery I
Battery K
Battery L
Battery M
2nd Missouri Light Artillery Regiment
Battery A
Battery B
Battery C
Battery D
Battery E
Battery F - Landgraeber's Battery of Horse Artillery
Battery G
Battery H
Battery I
Battery K
Battery L
Battery M

Engineers
1st Regiment Missouri Volunteer Engineers
Bissell's Engineer Regiment of the West
Balz's Company of Sappers and Miners
Gerster's Independent Company of Pioneers
Smith's Independent Company of Missouri Telegraph Corps
Voerster's Independent Company of Sappers and Miners

Colored Infantry Regiments 
1st Missouri Regiment of Colored Infantry - 62nd Regt United States Colored Troops
2nd Missouri Regiment of Colored Infantry - 65th Regt United States Colored Troops
3rd Missouri Regiment of Colored Infantry - 67th Regt United States Colored Troops
4th Missouri Regiment of Colored Infantry - 68th Regt United States Colored Troops
18th U.S. Colored Infantry - Organized in Missouri "At Large"

References

See also
 Lists of American Civil War Regiments by State
 List of Missouri Confederate Civil War units
 United States Colored Troops

Missouri
Civil War